Below is a list of current World Cup records in swimming claimed at the annual series of swimming meets run by the International Swimming Federation (FINA). Until August 2015 the events are always held in a short course (25 m) pool. The complete 2015 edition of the FINA World Cup switched to be held in a long course (50 m) pool.

All records were set in finals unless noted otherwise.

Long Course (50 m)

Men

Women

Mixed relay

Short Course (25 m)

Men

Women

Mixed relay

Gallery
Some of the current World Cup record holders:

References

World Cup
Records